Gary Broadbent (born 31 October 1976), also known as "Broady", is an English former rugby league footballer who played in the 1990s, 2000s and 2010s. 

Background
Broadbent was born in Barrow-in-Furness, Cumbria, England and raised on Walney Island.

Club career
Broadbent left the Widnes Vikings for the Salford City Reds in 1997 for a fee of £50,000 (based on increases in average earnings, this would be approximately £86,080 in 2013). 

He then joined Whitehaven in 2003. In 2008, he became the club record holder for most consecutive appearances, breaking the previous record set by David Fatialofa. He went on to make 83 appearances without missing a game for the club. 

He finished his career with hometown club Barrow, playing his last game in September 2011 against Toulouse Olympique.

International honours
Gary Broadbent won a cap for Emerging England while at Salford in 1998 in a 15–12 victory over Wales.

Personal life
Broadbent is employed by BNFL at Sellafield, and currently resides in Barrow-in-Furness with his wife, Emma and together they have two children, Sophie (born 1999) and Luke (born 2002).

References

External links
Barrow Raiders profile
Statistics at rugby.widnes.tv

1976 births
Living people
Barrow Raiders players
England Knights national rugby league team players
English rugby league players
Rugby league centres
Rugby league five-eighths
Rugby league fullbacks
Rugby league players from Barrow-in-Furness
Rugby league utility players
Salford Red Devils players
Whitehaven R.L.F.C. players
Widnes Vikings players